Manadur is a census town in Sangli district in the Indian state of Maharashtra.

Demographics
 India census, Manadur had a population of 3920. Males constitute 48% of the population and females 52%. Manadur has an average literacy rate of 61%, higher than the national average of 59.5%: male literacy is 74%, and female literacy is 49%. In Manadur, 13% of the population is under 6 years of age.

References

Cities and towns in Sangli district